is a Japanese footballer currently playing as a midfielder for Tegevajaro Miyazaki.

Career statistics

Club
.

Notes

Honours
 Blaublitz Akita
 J3 League (1): 2020

References

External links

1997 births
Living people
Japanese footballers
Association football midfielders
Hosei University alumni
J3 League players
Kashiwa Reysol players
Blaublitz Akita players